Agadadash Gurbanov (8 March 1911, Baku – 22 June 1965, Salyan) was an Azerbaijani theater and cinema actor, one of the founders of the Azerbaijan State Theatre of Young Spectators, performance artist in both tragedy, drama and comedy genre.

Life 
Agadadash Gurbanov was born on March 8, 1911, in Baku. The artist died on June 22, 1965. He was buried in Honorary Alley in Baku.

Career 
On March 15, 1927, Gurbanov made his debut performance in the play Storm by Latif Kerimli at the Club of Sailors. After that, Agadadash Gurbanov worked in the Workers' Theater of Children (later called the Theater of Young Spectators) in Baku until 1952. Gurbanov then acted in the National Drama Theater from 1952 until the end of his life.

Theatre performances 
Gurbanov performed in the following theatrical performances:

 Molla Ibrahimkhalil in Molla Ibrahimkhalil alchemist by Mirza Fatali Akhundzade
 Haji Gambar in Haji Qambar by Najaf bey Vazirov
 Karl Moor in The Robbers by Friedrich Schiller
 Khlestakov in The Government Inspector by Nikolai Gogol
 The Painter by Rabindranath Tagore 
 Mirza Samandar in Almaz, Abu Ubeyd in Ad Bride, Ötgun in Return by Jafar Jabbarli   
 Sheikh Marwan and Sheikh Sanan in Sheikh Sanan, Sayavush in Sayavush by Huseyn Javid
 Ibrahim Khan and Vagif in Vagif by Samad Vurgun 
 Shults in Far on the shores by Imran Gasimov and Hasan Seyidbeyli 
 Ivanov in Ophthalmologistas by Islam Safarli 
 Demirchi Musa  in Toy as by Sabit Rahman
 Jew in Marie Tudor by Victor Hugo
 The Rule of Love as Kemal by Jabbar Majnunbeyov
 Haji Kara in Haji Qara by Mirza Fatali Akhundzade
 Taghi Hussein by Javad Fahmi Bashgut
 Allan in Family name by Hussein Mukhtarov
 Guljamal inGood man by Mirza Ibrahimov
 Professor Mudrov in Shirvan Gözali by Anvar Mammadkhanli
 Akif in Hayat by Mirza Ibrahimov
 Ashraf Bey in Haji Qambar by Najaf bey Vazirov

Filmography 
 Sabuhi (1941)
 Shamdan bey (1956)
 Under the Burning Sun (1957)
 The Secret of the Mountain (1959)
 Koroghlu (1960)
 Our street (1961)
 The Telephone Operator (1962)
 Chained man (1964)
 Arshin mal alan (1965)
 Wool shawl (1965)

References 

Soviet male actors
20th-century Azerbaijani male actors
Actors from Baku
1911 births
1965 deaths